The Last Knight: The Twilight of the Middle Ages and the Birth of the Modern Era is a 2005 nonfiction book written by the medievalist Norman Cantor. The book uses John of Gaunt, 1st Duke of Lancaster as the focus around which he describes the medieval English culture of that time (1340-1399).

Cantor writes about some of the great families of the era, including Gaunt's own House of Plantagenet. From the Hundred Years War to Edward, the Black Prince, The Last Knight describes the ideas, people, and situations that John of Gaunt encountered.

References

2005 non-fiction books